Many police-related slang terms exist for police officers. These terms are rarely used by the police themselves.

Police services also have their own internal slang and jargon; some of it is relatively widespread geographically and some very localized.

A 
Alphabet Agency/Alphabet Soup 
Used in the United States to denote the multiple federal agencies that are commonly referred to by their initials such as the FBI, ATF, and DEA.
Amcalar
A Turkish language word meaning "uncles".
Anda
An Urdu language word meaning egg, for the pure-white uniform of traffic police in urban Pakistani areas like Karachi. 
Aynasız
A Turkish phrase derived from word ayna, referring to 'those without a mirror', a pejorative description of police lacking honor and having too much shame to look at themselves in the mirror. Often used by Turkish and Middle Eastern immigrants, particularly to describe police who will beat or assault them sans witnesses. Also, the first Renaults to enter the market in Turkey had no right rear-view mirrors. Most owners would simply get a mirror installed, but inasmuch as policemen did not want to pay out-of-pocket for one they were called "mirrorless" (aynasız).

B 
Babylon Jamaican slang for establishment systems, often applied to police. Derived from the Rastafari movement which, in turn, regards Babylon as symbolising debauchery, corruption and evil-doing in general. The term was used as the title of the 2014 British police drama Babylon.
 Bacon See Pig. Derogatory; derived from the term "Pig/Pigs"; can refer to a single officer or the police generally.
 Bagieta Polish slang term for police officer, that is: baguette and it is reference to police baton
 BAC French slang for police officer; acronym of the Brigade anti-criminalité in France.
 Barney Slang term, usually derogatory, for a town policeman; named for Barney Fife.
 Battenburg Referring to yellow and blue, large, squared, reflective checker pattern on UK police cars; refers to a type of cake. (Update from "Jam Sandwich" of earlier cars.)
 Bears Slang term for the police (citizen's band radio slang), "Smokey Bear” in reference to the Highway Patrol campaign hats. Seldom derogatory; very common with truckers in the US.
 The Beast US term used in this singular form to refer to any number of police officers,an entire police force, or police in general. This linguistic pattern results in an implied sense that individual police are all representative parts of one whole, monstrous creature with a united objective and attitude. Referenced most widely on The Fugees' album The Score and KRS-One's Sound of da Police.
 Beat cop inoffensive slang for patrolling officers.
 Benga Czech slang term for police officers. Derived from Romani language word "beng" meaning devil or satan.
 Bill Also Old Bill. The Bill was the title of a television police series in the UK, based in a fictional London borough.
 Bird US, slang for a police helicopter. See also "Ghetto Bird". Not to be confused with the UK parallel to "chicks", a more modern and now more common use of "birds."
 Bizzies UK, said to have been coined in Merseyside, as the police were always too "busy" to help citizens who reported low-level crimes such as house burglaries. An alternative origin is that the police are seen as "busybodies", i.e., they ask too many questions and meddle in the affairs of others.
 Black Maria (pronounced "Mariah") Slang term used in the UK, Ireland, and elsewhere; the police van used to transport prisoners, also used in the 19th century in the US and France with various suggested etymologies including racehorses or the infamous black, large, fierce Liverpool guesthouse owner, Maria Lea.
Black police黑警. A derogatory Cantonese slang widely used to insult a Hong Kong Police Force officer by pro-democracy supporters during the 2019–20 Hong Kong protests. Portmanteau for triad gangsters (黑社會) and police (警察) . See also triads for context.
 Blackshirt UK, derogatory name referencing the modern police uniforms and armed squads of Italian Fascists under Benito Mussolini.
 Blues and Twos UK, from the flashing blue lights and the two-frequency siren on a police car.
 Blueband UK, from the blue cap-band worn by PCSOs.
 Bluebottle Antique name for the police referring to the old-style uniform.
 Blue Canary Canadian, a term used by firefighters to rib police officers. Miners historically used canaries to monitor the air quality of a mine; when the canary died, the air quality was considered unworkably poor. Police officers have been known to put themselves at risk when rendering aid, usually running into a fire or other toxic atmosphere without proper training or personal protective equipment. Antonym: Hose Monkey.
 Blue Force US slang term for the police, mainly used in Florida.
 Blue Heeler Australian slang term, particularly in rural areas, in reference to the blue appearance and traits of the Blue Heeler Australian Cattle Dog. Blue Heelers was a long running Australian police television drama series.
 Blue Light Special Slang term for someone being pulled over.
  1960s and 1970s hippie slang for the police in Britain, referring to the blue uniforms.
 Bobby UK, derived from the Conservative British Home Secretary, Sir Robert Peel ("Bobby" being a nickname for "Robert"), the founder of the Metropolitan Police. Occurs in fixed phrases e.g. "bobby on the beat", "village bobby". Still used on UK Railways to describe signalmen and women, dating back to the earliest days of railway operations when a train driver was required to stop only at a policeman's order.
 Bœuf Quebec, ('ox'). Probably in opposition to the French term vache ('cow'), or for the usual featureless gaze of police officers colloquially called face de bœuf ('ox face'). Allows to call a police car an 'ox cart' (char à bœufs).
 Booked UK and US, usually after being arrested, to be taken to custody suite and held there in a cell. "They took me to the nick and they booked me." (Dizzie Rascal)
 Bofia a derogatory slang in Portugal used for police officers and law enforcement in general.
 Booze Bus Australian slang term referring to a police roadside random breath testing station, which are often specialized buses.
 Boy Dem UK slang term for one or more police officers.
 The Boys Term used by African-American communities in Baltimore.
 Boys in Blue In reference to the blue uniform.
 Brady Cops Police officers who have been dishonest are sometimes referred to as "Brady cops".
 Bronze Police slang term used in Mad Max originated in Australia but used in the UK.
 BTP Specialized use (mainly on UK railways) – abbreviation of "British Transport Police", the oldest and only fully UK national police force. Sometimes derogatorily known as "Sleepers" (US railroad "ties") but not due to their position in the track.
 Buck Rogers  UK (London and south east) comic/derogatory reference to officer using speed trap gun.
 Bull Railroad police in the US, most prevalent in the first half of the 20th century.
 BulleGerman for 'bull'. Slang for police officer, often derogatory. Bullerei and the plural Bullen refer to the police as a whole.
 Buttons (The) US, 1940s, referring to the large brass buttons of the era.
 Byling Old Swedish slang for patrolling officers. The word means "peeler" in Swedish and it is rarely used nowadays.

C
 Cana Slang term for police officers in Argentina ("walking stick"). Widely used against repressive police during December 2001 riots in Argentina, possibly because by then policemen used nightsticks against protesters.
 Candy cars Slang term for police cars in the UK as the is livery yellow and blue.  (Ambulances are yellow and green, fire service yellow and red, and transport (motorway) yellow and black.  Except for the black, all are reflective. The backs of all vehicles are red/yellow inverted chevrons—only red/yellow because the other colors are not legal on the back.
Cheese  In New Zealand, especially in the Auckland area police officers may be referred to as "The Cheese".
 Cherry Toppers, Cherry Tops, or Cherries Often used in reference to police cars which in some nations bear red lights on the top of the car. See Cherry top (slang).
 Chimps UK slang term for Community Support Officers, acronym for "Completely Hopeless in Most Policing Situations".
 CHiPS Used to refer to California Highway Patrol Officers.
 Chlupatej Czech slang term for police officer. Meaning of word is "hairy". Originated in the time of Austro-Hungarian Empire when officers wore helmets decorated with rabbit fur. 
 Chota Central American slang term.
 City Kitties Slang term for police officers.
 Coxinha Slang term for police officers in São Paulo, Brazil, likely derived from the fact that most of them eat the snack during their work intervals.
 Clear Often shouted when police, FBI, or SWAT teams have swept the area and no criminal activity is present at the specific area of the criminal scene.
 Cogne French, roughly means "to beat up". It is used in Les Misérables among others.
. Je crois à tout moment qu’un cogne me cintre en pogne !  — (Victor Hugo, Les Misérables, 1862, chap. III p.1261)
 Cop Shop US, UK, and Australia (and other Commonwealth English) slang for police station. Cop Shop was a long-running Australian television series.
 Cop, Coppa or Copper The term copper was the original word, used in Britain to mean "someone who captures". In British English, the term cop is recorded (Shorter Oxford Dictionary) in the sense of 'to capture' from 1704, derived from the Latin capere via the Old French caper. The OED suggests that "copper" is from "cop" in this sense, but adds that the derivation is uncertain. Many imaginative, but incorrect stories have come up over the years, including that cop refers to the police uniform's copper buttons, the police man's copper badge, or that it is an abbreviation for "constable on patrol", "constabulary of police", or "chief of police".
 Cosmonaut See Kosmonavt.
 County Mountie In Canada in reference to county police officers or sheriffs. Also used by truckers on their CBs to refer to county sheriffs or county police departments in the US.
 Crusher UK Victorian-era slang term for a police officer, from the slang term "beetle crushers" in reference to that era's heavy boots. 
 Cuntstable Derogatory UK slang term for a police officer, a portmanteau of constable and cunt.

D
 Danthe Slang for police officer (constables of patrol officers) in Nepal. The term is usually used as the police officers are carrying a stick with them. 
 Ds Slang for detectives, police.
 Dekosuke 凸助/デコ助, Japanese derogatory slang for police. Can also refer to someone with a large/protruding forehead. Applied to police due to the large badges adorning their caps.
 Dibble The name of fictional police officer in the cartoon Top Cat. "Dibble" has been adopted as a British-English derogatory slang term for police officer, especially one with Greater Manchester Police
 Dicks Slang for detectives. Apparently originally coined in Canada and brought south by rumrunners during Prohibition. The fictional comic strip character Dick Tracy was given the first name of "Dick" in token of its being a slang expression for "detective".  Dickless Tracy is used in Australia as slang for female police officers.
 Dirty police See also black police.
 Divvy Van Australian slang for police van (divisional van). The term is confined mostly to Victoria and Western Australia.
 Dogs Georgian and Polish slang for police; comparable with "pigs". Also a common derogative term for Hong Kong police officers. 
 Donut Patrol or Donut Muncher Refers to unhealthy police officers in the United States. Comes from night-shift officers stopping at doughnut shops for coffee, as they often used to be the only catering establishments open all night long.
 Double Bubble Refers to Australian highway patrol vehicles with rotating twin blue lights.
 Discowägeli Derogatory Term for police car in the German-speaking part of Switzerland, loosely translated as "disco cart". Might stem from the fact that some Swiss police use two different sirens on the same car (loud for daytime, muffled for night, or one set for city and one for country corps).

F
 Fakabát An old Hungarian term meaning "wooden-coat". The name originates from WW2 Hungarian army slang, where a wooden coat meant a box-like small wooden shelter at guard posts, just enough for a guard to step in and be somewhat protected from weather. Later, in the Socialist era, the police was issued with brownish vinyl jackets which became rigid in cold weather, and cops started calling them wooden coats, for they felt like actually wearing a guard box, as the name implies. The term is still widely known today. 
 Feds Usually used in the United States to refer to federal law enforcement agencies, especially the Federal Bureau of Investigation and the United States Marshals Service. Also used in Australia to refer to the Australian Federal Police, and in London as general slang for the Metropolitan Police Service, due to influence from U.S. media. 
 Federales Spanish, the Mexican Federal Police. The term gained widespread usage by English-speakers due to its popularization in films. The term is a cognate and counterpart to the slang "Feds" in the United States.
 Feo A term which indicates a law-enforcement officer approaching the speaker's vicinity. Taken from the Spanish word for "ugly", this slang term is exclusively used by the Puerto Rican and Dominican communities of Philadelphia and (to a lesser extent) New York City, United States.
 Filth Normally "The Filth", UK, the police. Inspiration for the Irvine Welsh novel Filth. Also common in Ireland, Australia and New Zealand.
 Five-O Derived from the name of the television series Hawaii Five-O, this term is used in the US. Non-derogatory, e.g.: "If you notice loose plastic cap over the card slot of ATM just call Five-O". It is sometimes shouted out as a warning by lookouts or others engaged in illegal activity when a police officer is spotted.
 Fízl Czech pejorative term for police officer.
 Flatfoot A term with uncertain origins. Possibly related to the large amount of walking that a police officer would do; at a time when the condition flat feet became common knowledge, it was assumed that excessive walking was a major cause. Another possible origin is the army's rejection of men with flat feet, who would often take jobs in law enforcement as a backup, particularly during war when established police officers would often join up (or be forced). What is known is that by 1912, flat-footed was an insult among U.S. baseball players, used against players not "on their toes." This may have been applied to police officers sometime later, for similar reasons.
 Flic A French word for police (singular "un flic", but more commonly used in the plural "les flics"), best translated as "cop". Much like "cop", this informal term is not derogatory. However, the extended version – "les flicailles" – adding the suffix -aille, is pejorative and corresponds to "pigs".

 Fucking Big Idiots Slang abbreviation for the Federal Bureau of Investigation. Derogatory 
 Fuzz, the Slang term for the police, possibly deriving from a mispronunciation or corruption of the phrase "the police force" or "the force". It may also refer to police radio static. The term was used in the title Hot Fuzz, a 2007 police-comedy film and Peter Peachfuzz from The Adventures of Rocky and Bullwinkle. The term is also referenced in the title of the Supergrass single "Caught by the Fuzz". CB radio lingo called the police "Bears"; fuzz was a spin-off from this (this is a dubious assertion, as the term fuzz is much older than the use of mobile CB radio and older than Smokey the Bear, whose hat type, worn by many highway patrols, is the source of the bears term for police) because bears are fuzzy. 
In use from 1929 and of unknown American origin.

G
Gabor Romanian pejorative referring to police men
 GaetsRussian, slang, Гаец, pl Гайцы. Only slightly disparaging; in general use, to mean traffic police officers. From the historical abbreviation GAI (Russian: ГАИ – Государственная Автомобильная Инспекция for State Automobile Inspectorate).
Gavver(UK, slang) A member of the police.
Gammon
 UK, see Bacon
 Gestapo Non-police-related slang term for door security (Bouncers) in reference to their white armbands. Reference to the secret police of Nazi Germany, also called the Gestapo.
 Ghetto Bird US, derogatory, slang for a police helicopter patrolling over ghettos.
 Glina Polish, widespread and non-derogatory term used for all police officers but specifically for higher-ranking or criminal police personnel. 
 Glowie Slang for an American federal agent, often used online. Originates from a quote by Terry A. Davis.
 Grass Cockney (English) rhyming slang for a police informant: Grasshopper = Copper. Alternative suggestions are from "Narc in the Park", or the song "WhisperingGrass".
 Gris (Swedish for pig. Pronounced with a long i) A derogatory term in Sweden for the whole police force or for a single police officer. 
 Grüne Minna (German for green Minna, short form of Wilhelmine), denomination for a prisoner transport in Germany and Austria, also "Grüner August" (German for green August) in some regions in Germany (like Hamburg, Swabia), or "Grüner Heinrich" (German for green Henry) in Austria as well
 Gschmierte for police officers, "Schmier" for the police, in Austrian German slang. Derogatory.
 GorraLower class Argentine slang, Spanish for "hat". Derogatory. 
 Guards or Guard Ireland, slang for the Garda Síochána or one of its members. Shortened from English translation guardians of the peace.
 Gumshoe US, derogatory, slang for detectives, who allegedly wear soft-heeled shoes or Hush Puppy shoes so they can follow suspects without being noticed.
 Gura Latin American Spanish slang for police enforcement, derogatory.

H

Ḥakem
Ḥakem (حاكم) is a Tunisian slang term for police, meaning "ruler" in Arabic. 
HNACH (حنش) 
is a Tunisian slang term for police, meaning "snake" in Arabic, Also used in Morocco for Inspectors since they don't work in uniforms.
Harness bull

American term for a uniformed officer. A reference to the Sam Browne belt that was formerly part of some police uniforms, also Harness cop, Harness man.

Havāladāra term meaning Constable in Marathi

Heat or The Heat 
For police and law enforcement in general (due to some police vehicles featuring red lights).

 Hendek French Slang for police officer. It comes from the Algerian dialect. It means "be careful".
 Hobby Bobby UK slang for special constables.
 Heh Derogatory denomination for the police, especially in Vienna, Austria
 Hurry up vanSlang term used on Merseyside to describe a police van.

I
 In the bag NYPD slang for being a uniformed patrol officer.
 Isilop Indonesian reversed words from Polisi (police)

J
 Jack or JacksEnglish/Australian slang term short for jackboots. The term can be used to describe a police officer, informant or an unreliable person. "To go jack on a mate" is the act of betraying associates or implicating them in a crime. A "jack" is someone who is considered not be trusted. Also old slang for CID in Liverpool.
 Jackboots Heavily armed police in riot gear
 Jake/Jake the Snake Slang term for the police originated in the Bronx (mildly derogatory).
 Jam sandwich, or Jam Butty UK, police traffic car, from the now largely obsolete historical colour-scheme – an overall white vehicle, with a longitudinal red, or red and yellow, stripe on each side. Still used for the metropolitan police in London. Silver cars with a red stripe down the side.
Jjapsae South Korean term for the police. Derogatory.
 Johnny Sometimes used to refer to the police in Upstate South Carolina.

K 

 Karao Used in Kenya to refer to police; seen as derogatory. Its source is the sheng language (mashup of English and Kiswahili).
 Keuf French, used in the plural "les keufs", as slang for the police. This word is more derogatory than "les flics", even though it means the same thing. The word is derived from the pronunciation of "flic" as "FLEE-KUH". In verlan slang, words are reversed, thus making the word "kuhflee". In turn, "lee" was dropped from the word, leaving "keuf".
 Kiberer also "Kiwara" in Austrian German slang for a police officer, in Vienna denomination for a police detective, "Kiberei" or "Kiwarei" for the police. Slightly derogatory.
 King's / Queen's Cowboys Canadian slang term for members of the Royal Canadian Mounted Police.
 Kollegen mat den Rallysträifen Luxembourgish, literally "colleagues / fellows with the rally stripes". A reference to police officers with their police cars, which in Luxembourg have three stripes on the bonnet and on each side, representing the national colours (red, white, light blue). Due to the fact that the police cars are white as well as the colour of the central stripe, it seems like they only have two stripes on it, like rally cars. It has a more or less humorous character.
 Kosmonavt Russian, referring to an OMON policeman equipped with riot gear (literally "cosmonaut").
 Krasnopyoriye Russian, slang, Краснопёрые sg Краснопёрый ("red-feathered"), outdated. Refers to the USSR police uniform of 1975–1990 having red collar insignia of rhombic shape.
 Kerovi Serbian slang for police, used to disrespect the police officers, comes from word ker which in slang means dog .
 Kchulim Hebrew slang for police officers. Comes from the word Kachol, which means blue.
 Kaka Slang for police in Maharashtra, literally means paternal uncle.
 Khatmal Slang for police in Hyderabad, India which means literally means bed bugs in Indian languages.
 Maatia kukura Meaning khaki dog in English, is a derogatory word for police in Odisha due to their khaki uniforms and rowdy behaviour.

L
 Law, Laws, or The Law Probably an abbreviation of the phrase "The long arm of the law" (suggesting that no matter how far they run, all criminals are eventually caught and prosecuted successfully).
 Legawye (pl) Russian Легавые (sg. Легавый). Literally "gundog", "pointer". According to one of many theories, this was part of the logo of the Moscow Investigation Department in 1928, although the term existed in the 12th century.
 LEOs Law Enforcement Officers.
LID Reference to uniform officers' headwear, often used as a putdown by the CID ex. 'Those bloody lids'; attempted derogatory CE.
 Local Yokel Reference to city or town police forces, almost solely used in conjunction with "County Mountie". Mildly derogatory.
 Lodówa a Polish slang term for a police van, literally "fridge"; refers to the large size and boxy shape of police vans.

M
 Mabando Term used to imply the presence of law-enforcement officers in a particular area.  Most commonly used by the Dominican and Puerto Rican communities of Philadelphia.
 Maatia kukura literally meaning kakhi dog, is a derogatory term for police in Odisha.
 Maama Hindi, मामा. literally meaning maternal uncle, commonly used in Hindi to describe a male police person, typically referring to traffic police.
 Mama/Mami Marathi, slang, मामा/मामी. literally meaning "maternal uncle/maternal aunt", it is one of the most common forms of addressing any strange male/female elder. Used frequently in Pune and Mumbai for traffic police personnel.
 Madama Italian term used when a police man is spotted on the site to advise someone during some sort of illegal action.
 Madero Slang, sometimes derogatory or vulgar. Spanish slang referring to a member of Cuerpo Nacional de Policia.
 Man, The Derogatory. Police officer or other government agent who has control, either by force or circumstance. Widely used in the United States, especially among African Americans and prisoners. Popular during the 1960s and 1970s by anti-establishment groups.
 Mata/Mata-Mata Common slang in both Singapore and Malaysia, "mata" means "eye" in Malay and connotes surveillance, thus becoming a metonym for the police.
 Meat Wagon Common UK term for a police van, typically a Transit van, used for transporting people from a crime scene to the police station. Not commonly used for police cars or riot vans.
"John got arrested for being drunk and disorderly, the Police cuffed him and threw him in the back of the Meat Wagon"
Not applicable in the United States, where the term is used to describe a coroner's van, nor in Germany, where a Mietwagen is a hired car.

Memur Bey
Common slang used in Turkey. Means "Mr. Officer".

 Ment Russian slang, Мент (pl. Менты). Only slightly disparaging, in general use (e.g. Ments is an alternative title for Streets of Broken Lights). The word dates back to the nineteenth century and is originally Hungarian, meaning "cloak" (because the Austro-Hungarian police uniform included a cloak).
 Messingen Norwegian, literally "The Brass", referring to police badges traditionally being made of said material.
 Městapo Czech term used for members of city police which is known for arrogant and harassing behaviour. Combination of term městská policie and secret police of Nazi Germany Gestapo.
 Millicents Term originated from the novel A Clockwork Orange.
 Militia Slang in Romania and various post-Soviet countries with roots from the secret police.
 Mr. Plod See Plod.
 Moosor Russian, lit. "garbage" (but countable), offensive. Etymology uncertain, theories suggested include the acronym MUS for "Moscow Criminal Investigation [Office]" (Московский Уголовный Сыск) in Tzarist Russia and Hebrew for "informer." Also, in Belarus, acronym MUS stands for Ministry for Home Affairs (Belarusian: Міністэрства ўнутраных спраў, МУС), and is embroidered on policeman uniform.
 Mountie(s) Canada, colloquial, Royal Canadian Mounted Police. Also used in Australia to refer to the mounted police sections of the various state police forces.
 Murija Serbo-Croatian, common colloquial term for "police"; from the Italian word muro, meaning "wall"

N

 Narc or Nark 1. A term used for an informant. 2. An undercover narcotics agent.
 Neighbour Partner (Possible only used in Scotland with Detectives).
 Nick Police station (British slang).
 Nicked To be arrested (British slang). Noddies.
 New Jack A rookie police officer; used in the New York-New Jersey-Connecticut tri-state area.

O
 Old Bill Term in use in London among other areas, inspiring the television series The Bill. This nickname's origin is obscure; according to the Metropolitan Police themselves, there are at least 13 different explanations. However, the word is quite old fashioned and is used much less nowadays, especially by younger people. 
 One Time Term used in many English speaking countries, used because one looks at the police one time, so not to attract attention.
 Onkel politi Norwegian, literally "Uncle Police", an obvious put-down referring to a guy who traveled around Norwegian schools in the sixties tutoring kids on traffic safety.
 Occifer/ossifer Slang term used to satirically reference the title of a police officer, while implying that the speaker is intoxicated. Popularized by the 1978 Cheech & Chong film Up in Smoke.
 Ōkami Derogatory Japanese term for police. The term is a pun: the word can mean "one who is above" (大上), a term often used "in reference to the emperor, one's lord, or the authorities"; "supreme deity" (大神); or "wolf" (狼). Commonly used by the protagonist of the dorama Gokusen.
 Ottowagen (German for "Otto car") colloquial for a police car in some regions of Lower Saxony, Germany

P 

 Paco A derogatory Chilean term for Carabineros, the national military police force of Chile. In Costa Rica, a familiar term for police, loosely derogatory. The term comes from the nickname "Paco" given to Francisco Calderón, a Security Minister in the 1940s.
 Paddy wagon A police van. So named in Liverpool, UK as most of the policemen and prisoners were of Irish extraction.
 Panda Car UK, a police car. Named because they were originally painted with large panels of black and white, or blue (usually light blue) and white. First started by the Lancashire Constabulary in the 1960s.  Original Panda cars were the same model of car bought by two adjacent forces – the one in black and the other in white.  The doors were then swapped between vehicles giving all the two-tone colour scheme one way round or the other.  Bonnets (hoods) could also be swapped.  Not clear if boot (trunk) lids were swapped.  Not all fitted with a blue beacon.  Some fitted with a large box shaped roof sign "police" with the blue beacon on top (or not).  Many were Morris 1000, Austin Morris Minis or 1100s.  Ford Anglias and later Escorts also used by some forces.  Colour scheme later changed to blue (usually light blue) with white doors – or, again, the reverse – light blue with white doors.
 Pandu Marathi, derogatory, पांडू. Used chiefly in Mumbai. This slang for policemen, especially hawaladars, ("Havāladāra", meaning constable in Marathi) came to be from the 1975 Dada Kondke film "Pandu Hawaldar".
 Panduri Serbo-Croatian, slang for a group of police officers. The meaning derived from the Latin word banderium, in which the word banderia also came from. They were military units created by Austro-Hungarian nobles in the 15th century, as well as light military border units composed of Croats, Hungarians, Romanians, and Serbs during the Ottoman Empire. Nowadays, it is used in Serbia (and parts of Bosnia, Croatia, and Montenegro) in a derogatory manner.Пандур
 Panier à salade French, lit. "salad basket", slang for a police van (cf. fourgon de police)
 Parak Slang term used for policemen in the Philippines.
 Paw Patrol Slang term for K-9 units or Dog Units in the UK.
 Party Van Russian, a police car or van, especially one housing an entire squad and sent out to perform a search-and-seizure and/or an arrest at a specific site. Hints at the party of police officers that it holds and/or the "party" it will "throw" at its destination.
 Pasma Derogatory term used in Spain to refer to the police in general. The singular form is "Pasmuti".
 Peeler UK, commonly used in Ireland and considered archaic in Britain, from Sir Robert Peel (see "Bobby").
 Perp Perpetrator/criminal instigator.
 Peterwagen (German for "Peter car") colloquial for a Hamburg Police car
 Pharaoh Russian, old-fashioned. Allegedly refers to Tsarist city policemen and passage guards standing still and emotionlessly on their posts, paying no attention to the bustling of the city around them. In older times, they were also armed with poleaxes or clubs that they were stereotypically holding like a sceptre.
 Picoleto In Spain it's a term used to refer to Guardia Civil. The term originates from "pico", meaning "spike" or "horn", referring to the tricorne worn by the members of Guardia Civil during most of its existence and still used nowadays in formal uniform.
 Piedipiatti Slang term used commonly in Italy to describe all kinds of police officers. Lit. flat feet.
 Pies Slang term used commonly in Poland to describe all kinds of police officers. 'Pies' means a dog in Polish and is understood to compare police activity to that of dogs i.e.sniffing around etc. Highly derogatory, not used in any official circumstances.
 Pig This derogatory term was frequently used during the 19th century, disappeared for a while, but reappeared during the 20th and 21st century. It became frequently used again during the 1960s and 1970s in the underground and anti-establishment culture. The adult cartoon Fritz The Cat (1972) portrayed the police as pigs, adding to the popularity of the term. Now prevalent in many English-speaking countries. It is also used in anti-authority punk, goth, metalhead, biker, mobster and hip-hop circles. Oz magazine showed a picture of a pig dressed as a policeman on a front cover and the term inspired "pig cops" in the video game Duke Nukem 3D.
 Pig Pen Cop shop, i.e., police station.
 Pinched To be arrested (American slang).
 Pikachu In Vietnam, this word refers to traffic police, who wear yellow suits and therefore resemble the Pokémon Pikachu.
 Plastic Policeman UK slang term for Police Community Support Officers.
 Placa Slang term for police officer or Police men. Origination Mexico
 Plod, PC Plod or PlodderSlang, UK and Australia. An allusion to Mr Plod the Policeman in Enid Blyton's Noddy stories for children, to plod meaning to walk doggedly and slowly with heavy steps.
 Plot To Plot up, Abbreviation of the term 'Park up and Look Out for Target'.
 Polda Czech slang for police officer. Originated as short of word "policista" – Czech term for policeman.
 Po-lé Indonesian term for Indonesian Police, popular amongst young students and streetboys in Jakarta and used to warn their friends during illegal streetrace or under-age riding.
 Polente Slang for the police in German, slightly derogatory.
 Polyp, Polypen (plural) Slang for Police officers in Germany. 
 Polis Scottish slang for police (not to be confused with the exaggerated US pronunciation 'po-leece'). Once common in Ireland but rarely heard today except in a jocular sense.
 Ponda Slang for policemen in Kashmir region of Jammu & Kashmir, India. It is said to have derived from the British Pound sterling, insinuating that the police are susceptible to bribery.
 Pony Soldier Royal Canadian Mounted Police.
 Porkchop Variation on Pig.
 Po-po, Popo, Popos, PoPo A derogatory street term for police. Originally from Southern California, where bicycle police, beginning in the 1980s, wore T-shirts marked 'PO', for 'police officer', in block letters. As these officers rode in pairs, their shirts would read 'POPO' when side by side. Yelled out by children to warn a neighborhood that police are in the area.
 Poulet French derogatory slang for police (literally "chicken"), similar to American English "pig".
 Pretty Police obsolete term used to describe officers deployed in men's toilets to lure homosexual men into a honey trap (source Call the Midwife)
 Probinsyano Another slang term used for policemen in the Philippines due to the famous TV Show Ang Probinsyano.
 Puerco Hispanic derogatory slang for police (literally "pig").
 Purken Norwegian slang for the police (literally "the sow").

Q
 Queen's / King's Cowboys Canadian slang term for members of the Royal Canadian Mounted Police.

R
 Rati Argentinean slang term for police officers derived from "rata" (rat). Also derived from vesre pronunciation of tira ("strap"), since older police uniforms featured a leather strap across the officer's chest. See Tira.
 Also used in Chile as slang for a member of the PDI.
 Reggin Slang used for non-white police officers in Latvia.
 Rent-a-Cop
 Not actually used to refer to police officers, but instead a derogatory term applied to any privately-hired security guard not acting as a bouncer or bodyguard.
 Road Pirates
 US, Slang for law-enforcement who perform traffic enforcement such as writing citations for speeding and reckless driving.
 Rollers
 US, Black slang for police officers widely used on the East and West Coasts in the early 1970s.
 Roussin French. In the 18th century undercover detectives in high society were dressed in a reddish (roussâtre) long jacket.
 Rozzers UK, slang for police officers, first recorded in the late 1800s.

S

 Sanki A Polish term for detention, literally "sleigh", comes from "sankcje" – sanctions.
 Sbirro Italian slang term for a police officer.
 Schmier Derogatory slang term for policeman in Switzerland. Literally German for 'dirt'/'smear'/'grease', derived from 'schmiergeld' or 'schmieren' – 'bribe money' and 'to bribe' respectively. Referring to police as a whole as a totally corrupt organization. Plural forms: (schmiere[n]) for male and (schmierin) for feminine. 
 Scuffer Term used in Liverpool for a policeman.
 Scum Commonly used in the U.K. Very similar in use to "The Filth" 
"The Scum are raiding John’s house. The Filth are never done harassing him!"
 Shades Term used to refer to An Garda Síochána, the police force of the Republic of Ireland. Derived from Traveller Cant, it is said to refer either to the two shades of blue on the Garda uniform, or to the practice of wearing peaked uniform caps, casting a "shade" over their eyes. It is also perhaps thought to refer to the sunglasses (or shades) they once commonly wore.
 Shickalon[e]y Garda Síochána, the police force of the Republic of Ireland. Based on a mispronunciation of Síochána.
 Shtar French slang for police. It is also used when referring to a pimple. 
 Six-up slang term for police originating in San Francisco, California USA in the mid-to-late-1970s; used primarily by Grateful Dead followers, so use of the term seems to be dying out.
 Smeris Dutch slang for police.
 Slops "Back-slang" formation from "police" spelled backwards, "ecilop" = "slop".  Common before World War II in the UK. Rare today.
 Smokey State police or troopers. Derived from over-the-road trucker CB radio calls, as popularized by the 1977 film Smokey and the Bandit. Though the portrayal of police in that movie was generally negative, the term itself is not always derogatory.
 Snut Norwegian/Swedish slang widely used for cops.
 Stater/Statie A state trooper, as opposed to a local county or federal police officer of the US.
 Stormtrooper(s) Mainly used to refer to riot police but can be used to refer to any group of police, referencing their paramilitary gear and blank uniform appearance alluding to both the German Stormtroopers of the World Wars (suggesting inherent authoritarian leanings) and the Imperial Stormtroopers of the Star Wars films (drawing connotations with being faceless henchmen).
 Suka Polish for "bitch", both in the sense of 'female dog' and as an offensive term, refers to a police van. Possibly a play on "pies".
 Svartemarja Norwegian (originally from English) referring to historic black police cars used to take people to jail.
 Sweeney, The UK slang term for the Flying Squad of London's Metropolitan Police Service. From Cockney rhyming slang: "Sweeney Todd" = "Flying Squad".

T 

 The Thin Blue Line The role of the police as the barrier between civilized society and chaos, inspiring a UK sitcom and two documentaries of the same name.
 Three Letter Agency Used in the United States to denote the multiple federal agencies that are commonly referred to by their initials such as the FBI, ATF, and DEA.
 Thulla ठुल्ला. A North Indian slang for policemen. One theory is that it is derived from "thulla", a name used in Eastern India for the jute gunny sack, which resembles the khaki uniforms worn by many police forces in the country.
 Tholo Slang used for police in Gujarat
 Tira A Brazilian Portuguese slang word (colloquial) for police officers, its origin comes from tira , since older police uniforms had a strap across the chest.
 Toniwagen (German for "Toni car") historical denomination for a Volkspolizei car in East Berlin, East Germany
 Tombo A Peruvian, Colombian and other South American countries' slang term, comes from switching the syllabes of  "Botón", which means button, an allusion to the ribbons or medals that police officers used to wear on their uniforms.
 Town Clown Town or city police officers, contrasted with county or state police. Usually considered derogatory.:
 Twelve / "12" "12" is a slang name whose popularity is currently on the rise. This name is used mostly by criminals or people to warn those indulging in crime or illegal activity that police officers are on their way. Although the term 12 is a police radio call code, urban slang has changed it into a warning phrase. One possible etymologies include 1312, the numeric representation of the acronym "ACAB" which stands for "all cops are bastards", as well as an account of the phrase deriving from the 1970s television show Adam-12 
 Triads黑社會. A derogatory slang given by pro-democracy supporters, during the 2019–20 Hong Kong protests, to hurl insult at members of Hong Kong Police Force after their failure in protecting train passengers from attacks by allegedly gang members and their alleged collusion during the attack at a train station in Yuen Long .
 Tyttebærpoliti Norwegian, literally "Lingonberry Police" (from the Securitas logo), referring to any privately hired security guard, excluding bouncers and bodyguards. Occasional plan B for Police Academy rejects.
Txakurra Euskera word meaning dog. Slang for a police officer, especially a member of Spanish Nacional Police.

V
 Vics US slang term for the police in the 1990s and 2000s, referring to the Ford Crown Victoria, a car model commonly used by police departments.
 Slang term used in Victoria, Australia for the Victoria Police.
 Also used by the police to refer to crime victims in the US.

W
 Wachtelsepp "waving Sepp" ('wachtel' lit. quail, but colloquially used for waving; 'Sepp' is the diminutive form for Joseph). Austrian German slang term for a cardboard cutout police officer usually set up to deter speeding. Dubbed "Kollege Vinzenz" by the Austrian police force.
 Walloper Australian slang for a police officer. Commonly used in the 19th to 20th centuries for the policeman on the beat, carrying a truncheon.
 Wankers Association Scottish term for the police overall, coined by Frank Anthony, and further made popular by Peter Anderson.
 Wanne German for "tub", local denomination of Berlin Police personnel carriers equipped with mesh window shields, Germany
 Water Rat Derogatory Australian slang for Water Police. Water Rats was a long-running TV police procedural based on the Sydney Water Police.
 Weiße Maus German for "white mouse", for their white uniforms and peaked caps that are generally not in use except for special events. In Germany: colloquial denomination of traffic police units of the state police forces and in Austria: colloquial denomination of motorbikes police units in general, although white uniforms and motorbikes are no longer in use.
 Whiter-than-White, The  Derisive term for a police force predominantly full of racist white officers; British-English in origin.
 Woodentop Uniformed police officer. Derisory term used by British plain-clothes detectives.
 Woody A plastic police officer. Derisory term used for British police.
 Wout Dutch slang for police, meaning authority.

Y
 Yuta Derogatory term for police used in Argentina, Uruguay and some parts of Chile, possibly a corruption of yunta (yoke) since they usually ride in pairs.

References

External links
Metropolitan Police – origins of the name "Old Bill"
Law Enforcement Terms & Abbreviations (US)
Law Enforcement Submitted Cop Slang – POLICE Magazine (US)

Slang
Police officers
Law enforcement-related lists